54 Leonis is a binary star system in the zodiac constellation of Leo, located around 321 light years from the Sun. It is visible to the naked eye as a faint, white-hued star with a combined apparent visual magnitude of 4.30. As of 2017, the pair had an angular separation of  along a position angle of 113°.

The magnitude 4.477 primary, designated component A, is an A-type main-sequence star with a stellar classification of A0 V, which indicates it is generating energy through hydrogen fusion at its core. It has a high rate of spin, showing a projected rotational velocity of 185 km/s. This is giving the star an oblate shape with an equatorial bulge that is an estimated 8% larger than the polar radius. The star 
is roughly 411 million years old with 2.4 times the mass of the Sun and about 2.88 times the Sun's radius.

The fainter magnitude 6.29 secondary, component B, is a smaller A-type main-sequence star with a class of A2 Vn. The 'n' suffix indicates wide "nebulous" lines due to rapid rotation. It is spinning with an even higher projected rotational velocity of 250 km/s. The star has about 2.59 times the Sun's radius.

Asteroid 729 Watsonia occulted HIP 53417 on March 3, 2013 at 01:48.

References

A-type main-sequence stars
Binary stars
Leo (constellation)
Durchmusterung objects
Leonis, 54
053417
094601/2
4259/60